Aerostan is a cargo airline based in Manas International Airport, Kyrgyzstan, which flew from 2004 to 2012 and again from 2020 on. The airline focuses on chartered cargo flights.

History
Aerostan founded in 2004, but had its license suspended in 2012. In the second half of 2020, Aerostan bought one Airbus A300B4-200F and two Boeing 747-200F, and converted a Boeing 727-200Adv into freighter. After acquiring the new planes, it resumed operation.

Fleet
As of September 2021, the Aerostan fleet consists of the following cargo aircraft:

 1 Airbus A300B4-200F
 2 Boeing 747-200F

Reference 

Airlines of Kyrgyzstan
Airlines established in 2004
Cargo airlines